Kvaløy Church is a parish church of the Church of Norway in Tromsø Municipality in Troms og Finnmark county, Norway. It is located in the village of Kaldfjord on the island of Kvaløya. It is the church for the Kvaløy parish which is part of the Tromsø domprosti (arch-deanery) in the Diocese of Nord-Hålogaland. The white, wooden church was built in a cruciform style in 1962 using designs drawn up by the architect Gunnar B. Haugen. The church seats about 260 people.

Media gallery

See also
List of churches in Nord-Hålogaland

References

Churches in Tromsø
Churches in Troms
Wooden churches in Norway
20th-century Church of Norway church buildings
Churches completed in 1962
1962 establishments in Norway
Cruciform churches in Norway